Vicente Alberto Álvarez Areces (4 August 1943 – 17 January 2019), also known as Tini Areces, was a Spanish politician. He served as the sixth President of the Principality of Asturias in Spain, and he was a member of the Spanish Socialist Workers' Party political party. He was also a member of the Committee of the Regions, working as a vice-president of the Party of European Socialists Group.

Areces was born in Gijón, and prior to his becoming President of Asturias in 1999, he had served as mayor of Gijón between 1987 and 1999. He died on 17 January 2019.

References

External links

1943 births
2019 deaths
People from Gijón
Mayors of places in Asturias
Spanish Socialist Workers' Party politicians
Presidents of the Principality of Asturias